Kramgoa låtar 1995 is a 1995 Vikingarna studio album, released as CD and cassette tape. With the album, Vikingarna charted at the Finnish album chart for the first time. The album sold platinum (over 100 000 copies) in Sweden, and platinum (over 50 000 copies) in Norway. It sold a total of 190 000 copies throughout Scandinavia and Finland. Three songs from the album charted at Svensktoppen, "I kväll", "Vänd dig inte om" and "Sommar, sol och varma vindar".

Track listing
I kväll
Vänd dig inte om
Om du vågar och vill
Crazy
Låt oss börja om (Save Your Heart for Me)
Sommar sol och varma vindar
Med varsam hand
Vägen hem
Kärleken förde oss samman
I Need Your Love Tonight
Bilder av dig (Crocodile Shoes)
Du är livet
Take Your Time

Charts

References 

1995 albums
Vikingarna (band) albums
Swedish-language albums